The 2016 Grambling State Tigers football team represented Grambling State University in the 2016 NCAA Division I FCS football season. The Tigers were led by third year head coach Broderick Fobbs. They competed as members of the West Division of the Southwestern Athletic Conference (SWAC) and played their home games at Eddie Robinson Stadium in Grambling, Louisiana. They finished the season 12–1, 9–0 in SWAC play to be champions of the West Division. They represented the West Division in the SWAC Championship Game where they defeated Alcorn State. The Tigers also defeated MEAC champion North Carolina Central in the Celebration Bowl, earning their fifteenth black college football national championship.

Schedule

Schedule Source:

Ranking movements

References

Grambling State
Grambling State Tigers football seasons
Black college football national champions
Southwestern Athletic Conference football champion seasons
Celebration Bowl champion seasons
Grambling State Tigers football